Two classes of destroyer of the United States Navy are known as the Farragut class:

  is a class of 8 ships launched in 1934–1935
  is a class of 10 ships launched in 1958–1960

Destroyers